Ferdinandea Island (also Graham Island, Graham Bank or Graham Shoal) is a certain volcanic island/seamount in the Mediterranean Sea near the island of Sicily that has, on more than one occasion, risen above the Mediterranean via volcanic action and soon thereafter been washed away. Since 300 BC this cycle of events has occurred four times.

The top of the island is presently 6 metres below sea level. The island's most recent "appearance" occurred in July 1831, but then by January 1832 the portion of the island above sea level had been entirely washed away again by the wind and the waves of the Mediterranean Sea. The 1831 version of the island was first visited by the Sicilian customs official Michele Fiorini on 17 July 1831, who planted an oar there to claim the newly emerged island for the Kingdom of Sicily.

On 2 August 1831 Humphrey Fleming Senhouse, the captain of the first rate Royal Navy ship of the line St Vincent named the island after Sir James Graham, the First Lord of the Admiralty, and claimed the island for the United Kingdom. In 1831, during the brief six-month lifespan of the island, a four-way dispute over the island's sovereignty arose, which was still unresolved when the island again disappeared beneath the waves in early 1832.

Seamount eruptions have raised it above sea level several times before erosion submerged it again.

During its brief life in 1831, French geologist Constant Prévost was on hand, accompanied by an artist, to witness it in July 1831; he named it Île Julia, for its July appearance, and reported in the Bulletin de la Société Géologique de France. Some observers at the time wondered if a chain of mountains would spring up, linking Sicily to Tunisia and thus upsetting the geopolitics of the region. It showed signs of volcanic activity in 2000 and 2002, forecasting a possible appearance; however,  it remains  under sea level.

Early history 
Volcanic activity at Ferdinandea Island was first recorded during the First Punic War during the 3rd century BC. The island is believed to have appeared and disappeared four or five times since then. Several eruptions have been reported since the 17th century AD. The island is located in a volcanic area known as the Campi Flegrei del Mar di Sicilia (Phlegraean Fields of the Sea of Sicily), in between Sicily and Tunisia in the Mediterranean Sea. Many submarine volcanoes (seamounts) exist in the region, as well as some volcanic islands such as Pantelleria.

1831 eruption and competing claims of sovereignty 

Ferdinandea Island's most recent appearance as an island was in July 1831. The first reports of high seismic activity and/or eruptions occurred during a period spanning from 28 June to 10 July 1831. These reports came from the nearby town of Sciacca. On 4 July an odour of sulfur spread through the town reportedly in such quantities that it blackened silver. On 13 July, a column of smoke was clearly seen from St. Domenico. The residents believed it to be a ferry on fire. On the same day, the brig Gustavo passed through the area, confirming a bubbling in the sea that the captain thought was a sea monster. Another ship reported dead fish floating in the water. 

By 17 July, a fully grown islet had formed enough to where Sicilian customs official Michele Fiorini was able to land there and to claim the island for the Kingdom of Sicily.

On 2 August 1831, Humphrey Fleming Senhouse, the captain of the first rate Royal Navy ship of the line HMS St Vincent claimed the Island for the British Crown and named it after Sir James Graham, the First Lord of the Admiralty. The eruptions of 1831 resulted in the island increasing in size to about four sq km. However, it was composed of loose tephra, easily eroded by wave action, and when the eruptive episode ended it rapidly subsided, disappearing beneath the waves in January 1832, before the issue of its sovereignty could be resolved. Fresh eruptions in 1863 caused the island to reappear briefly before again sinking below sea level.

Dispute 

In the months ahead, Ferdinandea Island eventually became the subject of a four-way dispute over its sovereignty, the island had been claimed for the United Kingdom and given the name Graham Island. The King of the Two Sicilies, Ferdinand II, after whom Sicilians named the island Ferdinandea, also sent ships to the nascent island to claim it for the Bourbon crown. The French Navy made a landing, and called the island Julia. Spain also declared its territorial ambitions. Each wanted the island for its useful position in the Mediterranean trade route (to England and France) and its close position to Spain and Italy.

Initial diplomatic disputes 
In August 1831, the volcano had risen above sea level. Although still only a couple of rocks, the Royal Navy thought it was very suitable as a base to control the traffic in the Mediterranean, as it was closer to the European continent than the island of Malta, a Crown Colony. The British fleet landed, named it Graham Island, after Sir James Graham, the First Lord of the Admiralty, and planted their flag, the Union Jack.

The King of Sicily also realized its strategic significance, and dispatched the corvette Etna to claim the new land and dub it Ferdinandea in honour of King Ferdinand II. Last on the scene was Constant Prévost, a co-founder of the French Geological Society, who compared the eruption to a bottle of champagne being uncorked. He named the island Julia, because it was born in July, and probably also in reference to France's July Monarchy. Diplomatic disputes over the island's status ensued. For five months, conflicting claims of sovereignty raged in newspapers and elsewhere as the four different nations vied for control over a roughly  piece of basalt.

Hopes for development 
During the island's brief lifespan tourists began to travel to the island to see its two small lakes. Sailors watched it when passing by, and nobles of the House of Bourbon reportedly planned to set up a holiday resort on its beaches. None of these ideas came to fruition, however, as the island soon sank back beneath the waters. By 17 December 1831, officials reported no trace of it. As dynamically as the seamount appeared, it disappeared, defusing the conflict with it.

Recent seismic activity 

In 2000, renewed seismic activity around Ferdinandea Island led volcanologists to speculate that a new eruptive episode could be imminent, and the seamount might once again become an island. In November 2002 the Institute of Geophysics and Volcanology in Rome observed minor seismic activity and gas emissions. They put the time of resurfacing at a couple of weeks or months. Italian sailors put an Italian flag on the top of the bank to avoid other nations' claims if the former island resurfaced.

Year 2000 Sicilian plaque with claim of Italian sovereignty  
To forestall a renewal of the sovereignty disputes, Italian divers planted a flag on the top of the volcano in advance of its expected resurfacing. To bolster their case, Sicilians, who call it Ferdinandea, summoned the descendant of the Bourbon King of Naples. In a ceremony filmed by a flotilla of camera crews, Prince Carlo di Bourbon lowered a plaque into the waves and told cheering locals: "It will always be Sicilian." Lobbied by fishermen and sailors, Ignazio Cucchiara, the mayor of Sciacca, invited Prince Carlo to attend the ceremony with his wife, The Duchess of Castro Camilla Crociani. To accommodate television crews the plaque was lowered well before reaching the shoal, which is a danger to shipping. Choppy waters forced divers to postpone the operation a week, until 13 November 2000. The diving crew planted Sicily's flag, which features a Medusa's head surrounded by three naked legs – a sign traditionally interpreted as "keep away."

The marble plaque, weighing , was inscribed "This piece of land, once Ferdinandea, belonged and shall always belong to the Sicilian people." The Prince told cheering locals: "It will always be Sicilian." But within six months, it had been fractured into twelve pieces, most likely by fishing gear but possibly by vandalism.

Significance

Scientific study 

The sudden geologic phenomenon was observed and studied by numerous scientists. Among the Germans were Hoffmann, Schultz, and Philippi. Among the English were Edward Davy and Warington Wilkinson Smyth. Among the French was Constant Prévost. Among the Italians there was Scinà Domenico (1765-1837) who published his observations in the "Effeméridi Sicilians" (1832, vol. 2), and Carlo Gemmellaro (1787–1866), teacher of geology and mineralogy at Catania University, who published "Actions of the Gioenia Academy of Catania" (1831, vol.8).

In 2006, further study revealed Ferdinandea Island to be just one part of the larger volcanic cone Empedocles.

Marine significance 
The island/ reef is still referenced on marine charts, as its top is only  short of breaking the surface, it thus becomes a potentially dangerous hidden obstacle for many seafaring vessels whose keels most often run deeper than this. It is also a small shoal on which near-surface maritime creatures dwell.

Nat Turner's rebellion 

In August 1831, observers around the world reported a discolored sun in the sky, tinted blue, purple, or green. Researchers have attempted to discover what volcanic activity was responsible for the stratospheric discharge that caused the discoloration, with an early consensus that Babuyan Claro in the Philippines was the most likely source. But later research has concluded there was no 1831 eruption at Babuyan Claro, and some have argued the smaller activity at Ferdinandea was the likely culprit.

Whatever caused the 1831 discoloration is historically significant in the United States, because Nat Turner, an enslaved preacher in Southampton County, Virginia, took the bluish-green sun as a divine sign to begin what became known as Nat Turner's slave rebellion, which ended with the deaths of more than 200 people and led to new laws across the South further restricting the liberties of slaves, including banning their education and limiting their religious freedom.

Cinderella Stamps and Art Coins 
A number of Cinderella stamps and art coins have been issued over the years, under fictional names such as Poste Isola Ferdinandea.

In 2000, an unofficial minting of a penny was produced by a Sicilian artist, featuring the former island on one side and, unusually, a bust of Elizabeth II on the other. David Mannucci, the designer of the coin, had the idea to produce it after he "found out the existence of the ghost island" from a newspaper article. Besides the copper piece, he minted varieties in silver, copper "with protective enamel", and in silver "with protective enamel". While this Italian-made coin fittingly bears the Italian name for the former island, the art coin also features a bust of "Elizabeth II D.G.R." and bears a British denomination.

In popular culture 
During its emergence it was visited by Sir Walter Scott, and it provided inspiration for James Fenimore Cooper's The Crater, or Vulcan's Peak, Alexandre Dumas, père's The Speronara, Jules Verne's Captain Antifer and The Survivors of the Chancellor and Terry Pratchett's Jingo. The island was also the subject of an episode of Citation Needed, a web show made by British content creator Tom Scott.

See also 
 List of islands of Italy
 List of volcanoes in Italy
 Volcanism in Italy
 Sabrina Island (Azores), an earlier volcanic island and diplomatic incident analogous to that of Ferdinandea Island

References

External links 

Disputed islands
Ephemeral islands
Islands of Sicily
Reefs of the Mediterranean Sea
Seamounts of the Mediterranean
Sciacca
Submarine volcanoes
Volcanoes of Italy
Former islands from the last glacial maximum